Dear Sandra (2007) is an artist book created by Atom Egoyan, inspired by and dedicated to the Luchino Visconti film Vaghe stelle dell'Orsa.

It was published by Volumin.

2007 non-fiction books